The Jebel Hatta is a Thoroughbred horse race run annually since 2000 at the Meydan Racecourse in Dubai, United Arab Emirates. Raced on turf, it is open to horses four-years-old and up who were bred in the Northern Hemisphere and to horses three-years-old and up who were bred in the Southern Hemisphere.

Inaugurated in 2000, it was run that year at a distance of 1700 meters. Since 2001 it has been raced over a distance of 1777 meters (app. 1.1 miles). Start from 2012, the race updated to Group One, become first two (within Al Maktoum Challenge, Round 3) UAE Group one races outside than Dubai World Cup Night.

Records
Time record:
 1:46:09 - Barney Roy 2020

Most wins by a horse:
 2 - Alfareeq 2022, 2023

Most wins by an owner:
 8 - Godolphin 2002, 2009, 2013, 2015, 2016, 2018, 2019, 2020

Most wins by a jockey:
 3 - William Buick 2013, 2016, 2020

Most wins by a trainer:
 6 - Saeed bin Suroor 2000, 2001, 2002, 2013, 2015, 2019

Winners of the Jebel Hatta

See also
 List of United Arab Emirates horse races

References
 The Jebel Hatta at the Emirates Racing Association
Racing Post:

Horse races in the United Arab Emirates
Sports competitions in Dubai
Recurring sporting events established in 2000
2000 establishments in the United Arab Emirates